The Confederate Memorial Gates in Mayfield are historical monuments at the entrances to Maplewood Cemetery in Mayfield, Kentucky. The monuments were the second monument in Mayfield established by the United Daughters of the Confederacy; the first being the Confederate Memorial in Mayfield in downtown Mayfield.  The gates were the third choice for monuments, chosen mostly due to their relatively low cost.  The UDC intended them to not only be a monument to the residents of Graves County who served the Confederate States of America, but also a civic improvement.

Description

The monuments are three pairs of stuccoed poured concrete gateposts, six in total, each. When closed. the main pair's gates read "The United Daughters of the Confederacy Memorial". The main pair have bronze plaques. The main pair of gateposts are each two feet wide and ten feet tall, with 27 feet between them. The center pair has no road between them; they are three feet wide, ten feet tall, and 285 feet away from the main gates. The third set are 330 feet away from the center gates, two feet wide and ten feet tall.

National Register of Historic Places

On July 17, 1997, the posts and gates were one of sixty-one different monuments to the Civil War in Kentucky placed on the National Register of Historic Places, as part of the Civil War Monuments of Kentucky Multiple Property Submission. One other monument on the list, the Confederate Memorial in Mayfield, is nearby in downtown Mayfield; the only other one in Graves County is the Camp Beauregard Memorial in Water Valley. In Maplewood Cemetery are the Wooldridge Monuments, also on the National Register. The only other gateway on the list is the Confederate Memorial Gateway in Hickman.

Gallery

References

Civil War Monuments of Kentucky MPS
Gates in the United States
National Register of Historic Places in Graves County, Kentucky
United Daughters of the Confederacy monuments and memorials in Kentucky
1924 establishments in Kentucky
Buildings and structures completed in 1924